The Associated Schools (TAS) is an incorporated body involving fourteen co-educational independent Queensland secondary schools in a variety of sporting and cultural activities established in 1956 following the disbanded Metropolitan Secondary School Sports Association in 1955, which had been established in 1950.

Schools 

The member schools currently participate in one of two competition divisions; The Associated Schools, and the Greater Brisbane Conference.

Sports
Apart from the core sports of Swimming, Cross-country and Athletics, all TAS sport is played on Saturdays over 3 trimesters. Each trimester is approximately nine weeks.

Championships

Swimming
Winning teams on aggregate points across all secondary school age groups for both boys and girls from 2000 onwards are listed below. The Associated Schools had blue and red conference divisions for co-educational carnivals from 2000 to 2013, and the higher blue division championship winners are listed for those years:

Championships, 2000–present: Ormiston (8), St Paul's (8), John Paul (4).

Boys' swimming

Winning teams on aggregate points for all secondary school age groups from 1956 onwards are listed below. The Associated Schools had blue and red conference divisions for boys swimming from 1986 to 2013, and the higher blue division championship winners are listed for those years:

 Championships:
 1999–present: Ormiston (10), St Paul's (7), John Paul (4).
 1956–1998: St Laurence's (20), Ashgrove (7), St Paul's (5), Iona (4), St Columban's (3), De La Salle (2),

Girls' swimming

Winning teams on aggregate points for all secondary school age groups for The Associated Schools (2000 onwards) and the Independent Schools Association (1988–1999) are listed below. The Associated Schools had blue and red conference divisions for girls swimming from 2000 to 2013, and the higher blue division championship winners are listed for those years:

  Championships:
 2000–present: Loreto (6), Ormiston (6), John Paul (3), Stuartholme (2), St Columban's (1), St Paul's (1), West Moreton (1).
 ISA, 1988–1999: Loreto (6), St Peters (6).

Athletics (track and field)
Winning teams on aggregate points across all secondary school age groups for both boys and girls from 2000 onwards are listed below. The Associated Schools had blue and red conference divisions for co-educational carnivals from 2000 to 2013, and the higher blue division championship winners are listed for those years:

Championships, 2000–present: John Paul (13), Canterbury (2), St Columban's College (2), Ormiston (1).

Boys' athletics

Winning teams on aggregate points for all secondary school age groups from 1956 onwards are listed below. The Associated Schools had blue and red conference divisions for boys track and field from 1985 to 2013, and the higher blue division championship winners are listed for those years:

 Championships:
 1999–present: John Paul (9), St Columban's (5), Ormiston (2), West Moreton (1).
 1956–1998: Ashgrove (21), St Laurence's (12), St Peters (4), Iona (3), Villanova (2), St Columban's (1).

Girls' athletics

Winning teams on aggregate points for all secondary school age groups from 2000 onwards are listed below. The Associated Schools had blue and red conference divisions for girls track and field from 2000 to 2013, and the higher blue division championship winners are listed for those years:

Championships, 2000–present: Canterbury (3), St Columban's (1), West Moreton (1).

Boys' premierships

First XV Rugby
List of First XV premiers since 1956 are listed below. The Associated Schools had blue and red conference divisions from 1985 to 2013, and the higher blue division premiership winners are listed for those years:

 Premierships:
 2000–present: John Paul (7), Ormiston (7), St Columban's (7), St Paul's (2), Rosalie (1), Scots PGC (1).
 1956–1998: Ashgrove (24), St Laurence's (9), St Peters (7), Villanova (5), De La Salle (3), Iona (1), St Columban's (1).

 indicates shared premiership for the year.

First VI Volleyball
List of First VI premiers since 1956 are listed below. The Associated Schools had blue and red conference divisions from 1985 to 2013, and the higher blue division premiership winners are listed for those years:

 Premierships:
 2000–present: Ormiston (8), St Paul's (6), Canterbury (2), John Paul (2), Cannon Hill (2),.
 1986–1999: Iona (1), St Paul's (1), St Columban's (4), St Peters (1), Villanova (7), Redeemer (1).

 indicates shared premiership for the year.

First XI Football
List of First XI premiers since 1956 are listed below. The Associated Schools had blue and red conference divisions from 1985 to 2013, and the higher blue division premiership winners are listed for those years:

 Premierships:
 2000–present: John Paul (14), St Paul's (4), Canterbury (1), Cannon Hill (1), Ormiston (1), West Moreton (1).
 1986–1999: St Paul's (3), Ashgrove (3), John Paul (2), Villanova (1), Rosalie (1), St Laurence's (1), Padua (1).

 indicates shared premiership for the year.

First XI Cricket
List of First XI premiers since 1956 are listed below. The Associated Schools had blue and red conference divisions from 1985 to 2013, and the higher blue division premiership winners are listed for those years:

 Premierships:
 2000–present: John Paul (10), Ormiston (5), St Columban's (2), St Paul's (3), West Moreton (2), Canterbury (1), Redeemer (1).
 1956–1998: Ashgrove (18), Rosalie (6), St Laurence's (5), Iona (3), St Paul's (3), St Columban's (2), De La Salle (1), John Paul (1), St Edmund's (1), St Peters (1), Villanova (1).

Girls' premierships

First XI Hockey
List of First XI premiers since 2000 are listed below. The Associated Schools had blue and red conference divisions from 2000 to 2013, and the higher blue division premiership winners are listed for those years:

 Premierships:
 2000–present: Ormiston (7), Cannon Hill (3), West Moreton (3), Loreto (2), St Paul's (2), Scots PGC (2), Canterbury (1), John Paul (1), St Columban's (1), Stuartholme (1).

 indicates shared premiership for the year.

First VII Netball
List of First VII premiers for The Associated Schools (since 2000) and the Independent Schools Association (1988–1999) are listed below. The Associated Schools had blue and red conference divisions from 2000 to 2013, and the higher blue division premiership winners are listed for those years:

  Premierships:
 2000–present: John Paul (18), St Columban's (2).
 ISA, 1988–1999: John Paul (5), Loreto (2), Redeemer (1).

 indicates shared premiership for the year.

Notes
 Many of these schools withdrew from TAS to form the Associated Independent Colleges after the 1998 competition season.

 Due to the COVID-19 pandemic, no aggregate school championships were awarded in swimming, cross country and athletics (limited individual events were contested only). Open premierships were only awarded for the first trimester sports.

References

1956 establishments in Australia
Australian school sports associations